The 2014–15 Air Force Falcons men's basketball team represented the United States Air Force Academy during the 2014–15 NCAA Division I men's basketball season. The Falcons, led by third head coach Dave Pilipovich, played their home games at the Clune Arena on the Air Force Academy's main campus in Colorado Springs, Colorado and were a member of the Mountain West Conference. They finished the season 14–17, 6–12 in Mountain West play to finish in ninth place. They defeated New Mexico to advance to the quarterfinals of the Mountain West tournament where they lost to Boise State.

Previous season 
The Falcons finished the season 12–18, 6–12 in Mountain West play to finish in tenth place. They lost in the first round of the Mountain West Conference tournament to Fresno State.

Departures

Recruiting

Roster

Schedule and results 

|-
!colspan=9 style="background:#0038A8; color:#A8ADB4;"| Exhibition

|-
!colspan=9 style="background:#0038A8; color:#A8ADB4;"| Regular season

|-
!colspan=9 style="background:#0038A8; color:#A8ADB4;"| Mountain West tournament

References 

Air Force
Air Force Falcons men's basketball seasons
Air Force Falcons men's basketball
Air Force Falcons men's basketball